Arsiè is a comune (municipality) in the province of Belluno in the Italian region of Veneto, located about  northwest of Venice and about  southwest of Belluno.

The municipality of Arsiè contains the frazioni (subdivisions, mainly villages and hamlets) Mellame, Rocca, Fastro, Rivai, and San Vito.

Arsiè borders the following municipalities: Castello Tesino, Cismon del Grappa, Enego, Fonzaso, Grigno, Lamon, Seren del Grappa and Pontet (a frazione of Imer, TN).

Demographic evolution

References

External links 
 www.arsie.info/

Cities and towns in Veneto
Articles which contain graphical timelines